Suzanne Wasserman (May 26, 1957 – June 26, 2017), was a Chicago-born historian, Professor, writer, and film director. Besides her exceptional tenure as Director of the Gotham Center for New York City history, she may be best known for her first film, completed in 2003, Thunder in Guyana, which she wrote, produced, and directed.  The film documented the life of her mother's first cousin, Chicago-born Janet Rosenberg Jagan, who served as the President of Guyana, South America from December 19, 1997, to August 11, 1999.

Early life and education
Wasserman was born Suzanne Rachel Wasserman on May 26, 1957, in Hyde Park, Chicago, Illinois, the daughter of Jewish parents Edward Wasserman, a psychoanalyst and social progressive and Eileen (née Kronberg), an artist and activist for peace who started an artists' cooperative gallery in Hyde Park.  Her paternal grandfather Samuel Wasserman, from an old world religious Jewish family, immigrated to America around 1920 from the Western Ukrainian town of Kamianets-Podilskyi, then part of the Russian Empire.  Samuel had an interest in social causes, and was briefly active in the labor movement in the 1930s.

Wasserman was one of four sisters, that included her twin sister Tina, and younger sisters, Stephanie and Nadine.  She graduated from Kenwood Academy prior to beginning her undergraduate studies at Brandeis University. While growing up in Chicago, her sister said "Suzanne was very interested in history because there were so many people in Hyde Park with really interesting backgrounds, whether they were associated with the University of Chicago or whether they had an immigrant story or whether they were political".

Wasserman earned a  Bachelor's degree in History from the University of Wisconsin after transferring from Brandeis University, and a Phd. in American History from New York University.  Brandeis had a large Jewish enrollment and it likely influenced her future career focus as did her senior thesis at Wisconsin where she studied her college town, writing on life in Madison in the 1960s.  She obtained her Phd. from New York University in American History, writing her doctoral dissertation on life on the Lower East Side during the Depression.

Career

History professor, and author
In the 1980s, she made New York City, particularly the Lower East Side, her residence and the center of her work in a wide array of publications, exhibitions and educational programs.  After completing her Phd. at New York University, she worked as a Professor at the New School for Social Research, and at Iona College teaching American History, World History, Urban Studies and other topics.  She published widely on the Great Depression, Jewish nostalgia, housing, restaurant culture, tourism, pushcart peddling, silent films, the Jewish silent screen siren Theda Bara, 19th century saloons and 21st century street fairs.  In the 1990s, she worked as a consultant and then staff member for the Lower East Side Tenement Museum on Orchard Street.

Director of CUNY's Gotham center for New York City history
In 2000, she was hired as Associate Director of the Gotham Center for New York City History, then a start-up organization at the Graduate Center of the City University of New York. She was later promoted to Director. The group brought together teachers, students, scholars, librarians, archivists, filmmakers and museum curators to make the city's history more accessible.  As the Gotham Center's Director, Wasserman created and organized seminars and conferences, built its website, and managed teaching programs that brought New York history into school classrooms.  One historian noted that Wasserman's work "was aimed at understanding the deep cultural and social networks that still supported certain ethnic institutions on the Lower East Side".  While at New York University, she worked as an instructor of museum studies and public history in conjunction with her position as Director of the Gotham Center.

Film
During her tenure as Director of the Gotham Center, Wasserman established her second career as a film maker, writer, and director.  She directed four successful film documentaries which were shown in many film festivals and on the PBS series Independent Lens and America ReFramed, among others.

Best known films and publications
"Schpritzing, Shvitzing and Fressing: Or, a Critical Look at Memories of the "good Old Days" on New York's Lower East Side", 40 pages, One edition,(1984), held by WorldCat Identities.
"Thunder in Guyana", (2003), director, writer and producer.  The life story of Suzanne's mother's cousin, Janet Rosenberg Jagan who briefly became President of Guyana in December, 1997, holding the post for twenty months after the death of her husband who formerly held the position.  In Guyana's election of 1953, the first with universal adult suffrage, Cheddi Jagan, Janet's husband, was elected Chief Minister and Janet became the country's first female minister and deputy speaker of Parliament. They led the first Communist government in the Western hemisphere, creating a firestorm in the press.  The couple's political administrations sparked the first socialist revolution in the Western hemisphere and made Janet the first American born woman to lead a country. Janet and her husband founded the Marxist-Lenninist People's Progressive Party (PPP) in 1950, a multi-racial organization which opposed British Colonial rule.  Janet remained General Secretary of the organization for decades.  Leading the country for only 133 days in 1953 following a free election, she and Cheddi were first deposed and then jailed in 1955 on orders of Winston Churchill who feared the existence of a Communist country in the Western hemisphere.  Churchill wished to prevent the potential for Russia to form ties with the new government, though this never occurred, and the Jagans never sought Russia's assistance.  After their release, Dr. Jagan returned to office as chief minister in the election of 1957, and Ms. Jagan became minister of labor. The Kennedy administration pressured Cheddi's Presidency in the 1960s using the CIA to spread misinformation, and foster labor and race riots.  In 1964, the United States convinced Britain to create constitutional changes in Guyana which made it impossible for Cheddi to stay in power as Prime Minister or President, despite his popularity.  The Jagans were reluctant to nationalize industries at first, particularly the large bauxite industry which was not nationalized until 1971, with the initial support of the Jagan's PPP.  Guyana was the world's fourth largest producer of bauxite, the primary ore in aluminum.  British Guyana gained independence from Great Britain in 1966.  Most of the nationalization of industries occurred around 1975 under the opposition PNC party of reigning President Forbes Burnham, which nationalized the sugar, timber, and bauxite industries and a large British owned engineering and boat building company.  With America's blessing on New Years Day in 1975, the American owned bauxite company Reynolds Guyana Mines Ltd. in Berbice was nationalised and renamed BERMINE.  Burnham's twenty five years in government saw the nationalization of industries, but at the cost of accumulating the worst foreign debt in the hemisphere and the banning of free elections.  By the 1980s, half of Guyana's population had fled the country due to deflation of the currency, and a diminished standard of living.  Retaining his popular support, having worked in Parliament as the opposition party during his time out of the highest office, Cheddi Jagan returned to the Presidency in 1992 in the first free Guyanese election in years.  Jagan associated the PPP with Democratic Socialism rather than Communism and attempted to improve the economy.  During their time out of higher office, Janet was elected opposition member of Parliament in 1973, 1980 and 1985. Cheddi Jagan's return to the Presidency came in 1992 in the first free election in years, and he remained in office until his death in 1997, when Janet took over the position after several months, remaining in office from December 1997 until August 1999.  By the end of her career, Janet became the longest serving member of the Guyanese Parliament, holding office for a total of 46 years.  With Editor and Co-Writer, Amanda Zinoman, Cinematography by Debra Granik, and Executive Producer, Deborah Shaffer.  The film is distributed by Women Make Movies (462 Broadway, 5th Floor,  New York, NY 10013)
"Brooklyn Among the Ruins", (2005), a short video documentary about Paul Kronenberg, a sixty year old subway buff and former math tutor and delivery truck driver, who built a life-size 1930's motorman's car in his apartment in Sheepshead Bay, Brooklyn. Through his deep appreciation for the decaying New York subway stations, Paul reminds us of our own aging process.
One episode documentary about the film, "Thunder in Guyana", (2005), for Independent Lens, a series featured on PBS
"Life on the Lower East Side, 1937-1950", (2006) Co-author of book with Peter E. Dans, photographs by Rebecca Lepkoff (Princeton Architectural Press, New York)  Contains over 200 two-toned photographs. With the exceptional photographs of Rebecca Lepkoff, the book highlights the lost neighborhood  between the Brooklyn and Manhattan bridges, from the Bowery to the East River, and captures the lives and times of a vibrant, and functional multi-ethnic community consisting of Italians, Irish, Jews, Greeks, Spaniards, Chinese, Puerto Ricans, and African Americans. Lepkoff's images reveal a forgotten time and place and show how the Lower East Side has both remained the same and changed forever.
"Sweatshop Cinderella", (2010), an award-winning video documentary short about the Jewish immigrant writer Anzia Yezierska, who came to America from Poland around 1890, and brought to light struggles of Jewish and later Puerto Rican immigrants in New York's Lower East Side.   Having once worked in the lower East Side's dismal sweatshops and laundries, Yezierska explored the cost of acculturation and assimilation among immigrants over a fifty-year writing career.  At the request of philosopher John Dewey, with whom she had an on and off relationship, Yezierska devoted herself full-time to writing award-winning stories and novels in Yiddish-English dialect that received exceptional reviews. Hollywood turned two of her works into movies, and called on her to write screenplays. From the pain of poverty, and menial labor in sweatshops, Yezierska pushed herself to express her experience in writing.  The film is distributed by Women Make Movies.
Meat Hooked!, Phizmonger Pictures, (2013) Explores 200 years of the craft of butchering, its modern renaissance, and the lives of three butchers, including Jeffrey Ruhalter, who had a family run shop in the Essex Street Market on New York's Lower East Side.  First aired July 7, 2013 on PBS.  The film follows two other butchers; Jessica and Joshua Applestone at Fleisher's in Kingston, NY and Jake Dickson at Chelsea Market, near the Meat Packing District of Manhattan. The  film follows the meat making process from farm to table and includes scenes at a recent pig slaughter in Stone Ridge, NY as well as an organic farm in Schoharie, NY.
Children and Their Discontents, an unfinished film about the children of psychoanalysts.

Wasserman also consulted with director Ron Howard on the film "Cinderella Man" (2005), providing information on New York's Lower East Side during the depression.

Final days
Wasserman died on June 26, 2017 at her home in Stuyvesant Town in Manhattan.  According to her son, Raphael Stern, the cause of death was progressive supranuclear palsy, a rare brain disorder.

References

1957 births
Jewish women writers
American film directors
American women screenwriters
Jewish American writers
American women film directors
New York University faculty
2017 deaths
Historians of New York City
American women academics
21st-century American Jews
21st-century American women